Motzki is a German television series.

See also
List of German television series

External links
 

1993 German television series debuts
1993 German television series endings
German comedy television series
Television shows set in Berlin
German-language television shows
Das Erste original programming